The Hsandagolian age is a period of geologic time (33.9 – 23.03 Ma) within the Oligocene epoch of the Paleogene used more specifically with Asian Land Mammal Ages. It follows the Kekeamuan and precedes the Tabenbulakian age.

The Ulangochuian's lower boundary is the approximate base of the Rupelian age and upper boundary is the approximate upper base of the Aquitanian.

References

Oligocene